The  was held on 4 February 2001 in Kannai Hall, Yokohama, Kanagawa, Japan.

Awards
 Best Film: Face
 Best Actor: Tadanobu Asano – Gojoe, Jirai o Fundara Sayōnara
 Best Actress: Naomi Fujiyama – Face
 Best Supporting Actor:
Teruyuki Kagawa – Dokuritsu Shōnen Gasshōdan, Suri
Jun Murakami – Nabbie's Love, Futei no Kisetsu, New Battles Without Honor and Humanity
 Best Supporting Actress: Naomi Nishida – Nabbie's Love
 Best Director: Junji Sakamoto – Face
 Best New Director: Akira Ogata – Dokuritsu Shōnen Gasshōdan
 Best Screenplay: Junji Sakamoto and Isamu Uno – Face
 Best Cinematography: Masami Inomoto – Dokuritsu Shōnen Gasshōdan
 Best New Talent:
Sora Tōma – Dokuritsu Shōnen Gasshōdan
Ryuhei Matsuda – Taboo
Kirina Mano – Suri, Bullet Ballet
 Special Jury Prize: Yukiko Shii – Face
 Special Prize: Masaru Konuma – Nagisa – For directing film as well as for his work

Best 10
 Face
 Nabbie's Love
 First Love
 Gohatto
 Dokuritsu Shōnen Gasshōdan
 The City of Lost Souls
 Suri
 Charisma
 Nagisa
 A Class to Remember IV
runner-up. After the Rain

References

Yokohama Film Festival
Y
Y
2001 in Japanese cinema
February 2001 events in Japan